Gołębsko  is a settlement in Gmina Miastko, Bytów County, Pomeranian Voivodeship, in northern Poland, on the border with West Pomeranian Voivodeship.

From 1975 to 1998 the village was in Słupsk Voivodeship.

References

Map of the Gmina Miastko

Villages in Bytów County